Three Live Ghosts is a 1936 American comedy film directed by H. Bruce Humberstone and starring Richard Arlen, Claud Allister and Cecilia Parker.

The film was produced by Metro-Goldwyn-Mayer as a remake of the 1929 film of the same title, itself based on a 1920 play by Frederic S. Isham inspired by his own 1918 novel.

Synopsis
Three soldiers of the British Army, including an American, are reported killed in action during the First World War. In fact they are being held as prisoners of war by the Germans. After the war they return to London, where they find they are considered official dead. The stepmother of one has spent all the money she has received in compensation, another is an eccentric aristocratic-type who has lost his memory while the third is an American who has a private detective searching him out.

Cast 
Richard Arlen as William 'Bill' Jones
Beryl Mercer as Mrs. Gibbins
Claud Allister as Lord 'Spoofy' Brockton 
Charles McNaughton as James 'Jimmie' Gubbins
Cecilia Parker as Ann Gordon
Dudley Digges as Inspector Briggs
Nydia Westman as Peggy 'Peg' Woofers
Jonathan Hale as Detective Bolton
Lillian Kemble-Cooper as Lady Brockton 
Robert Greig as John Ferguson
 Wallis Clark as	Detective Harris 
 Anita Deniston as Tommy Brockton 
 Joseph North as Parker
 Forrester Harvey as Paymaster 
 Clare Verdera as Brockton's Maid
 Sidney Bracey as 	Book Merchant
 Frederik Vogeding as Officer of the Day 
 Egon Brecher as 	German Officer
 Roland Varno as 	German Corporal

References

External links 
 

1936 films
1930s English-language films
American comedy films
1936 comedy films
Metro-Goldwyn-Mayer films
Films directed by H. Bruce Humberstone
American black-and-white films
Remakes of American films
American films based on plays
Films set in London
Films set in the 1910s
1930s American films